Peter Richard Carey (born 14 April 1933 in Barking, Essex, England), is an English footballer who played as a left back in the Football League. He later managed Barking from January 1982 until December 1983. In March 2011, he was retired, living in Brentwood, Essex.

References

External links

1933 births
Living people
English footballers
Footballers from Barking, London
Association football defenders
Barking F.C. players
Leyton Orient F.C. players
Queens Park Rangers F.C. players
Aldershot F.C. players
Colchester United F.C. players
English Football League players
Barking F.C. managers
Dover F.C. players
English football managers